Frederick Francis III (19 March 1851 – 10 April 1897) was the penultimate Grand Duke of Mecklenburg-Schwerin.

Biography
He was born in Schloss Ludwigslust as the son of Frederick Francis II, Grand Duke of Mecklenburg-Schwerin and his first wife Princess Augusta Reuss of Köstritz. He succeeded his father as Grand Duke on 15 April 1883.

From an early age Frederick Francis suffered from asthma and severe breathing difficulties. He could not live in the north of Europe and lived instead on the shores of the Mediterranean, where the mild climate agreed with him. His homosexuality was an open secret.

Frederick Francis' death in Cannes on 10 April 1897 is shrouded in mystery, as he was originally reported to have committed suicide by throwing himself off a parapet of a bridge. According to the official account of his death, however, he was in his garden when he experienced breathing difficulties and staggered around before falling over a low wall. He was succeeded by his son Frederick Francis IV, who would be the last Grand Duke of Mecklenburg-Schwerin.

Marriage and children
Frederick Francis married Grand Duchess Anastasia Mikhailovna of Russia in Saint Petersburg on 24 January 1879. They had three children:

Duchess Alexandrine of Mecklenburg-Schwerin (24 December 1879 – 28 December 1952) she married King Christian X of Denmark on 26 April 1898. They had two sons.
Frederick Francis IV, Grand Duke of Mecklenburg-Schwerin (9 April 1882 – 17 November 1945) he married Princess Alexandra of Hanover and Cumberland on 7 June 1904. They had five children.
Duchess Cecilie of Mecklenburg-Schwerin (20 September 1886 – 6 May 1954) she married Wilhelm, German Crown Prince on 6 June 1905. They had six children.

Honours
He received the following orders and decorations:
German honours

Foreign honours

Ancestry

Literature
 Bernd-Ulrich Hergemöller, Mann für Mann, pages 253
 Hans von Tresckow, Von Fürsten und anderen Sterblichen, Erinnerungen eines Kriminalkommisars, 1922, Berlin, page 89

References

External links

1851 births
1897 deaths
19th-century German LGBT people
Dukes of Mecklenburg-Schwerin
Generals of Cavalry (Prussia)
Grand Dukes of Mecklenburg-Schwerin
Hereditary Grand Dukes of Mecklenburg-Schwerin
House of Mecklenburg-Schwerin
LGBT heads of state
German LGBT people
LGBT Protestants
LGBT royalty
German landowners
People from Ludwigslust
Protestant monarchs
Grand Crosses of the Order of Saint Stephen of Hungary
Recipients of the Iron Cross (1870), 2nd class
Recipients of the Order of St. Anna, 1st class
Recipients of the Order of St. George of the Fourth Degree
Recipients of the Order of the White Eagle (Russia)
Military personnel from Mecklenburg-Western Pomerania